Simon Edward Rusk (born 17 December 1981) is a professional football manager and former professional footballer, and is currently head coach of the England U19s. He holds a UEFA pro licence. Previously manager of Brighton & Hove Albion Under 23s, Rusk was responsible for the progression of many young talents to the Brighton first-team in recent years, including Aaron Connolly, Steven Alzate, Solly March and Ben White. As a player, he played as a midfielder, notably for Boston United. Born in England, he made three appearances for the Scotland U18 national team.

Playing career

Boston United
Born in Peterborough, Cambridgeshire, Rusk joined the Peterborough United youth system in 1995 and had a spell on loan in the Southern Football League Premier Division with Cambridge City during the 1999–2000 season. He was signed on a free transfer by Boston United in March 2001 after being released by Peterborough. His Boston debut came in March 2001 in a match at Doncaster Rovers. He was fined by manager Steve Evans for receiving a red card against Shrewsbury Town in December 2005. He had surgery on a knee injury in December 2006, which ruled him out until after Christmas.

Northwich Victoria
He left Boston to join Northwich Victoria on a free transfer on 2 July 2007, being signed by former Boston teammate Neil Redfearn. Rusk scored on his debut for Northwich, in the 2–1 loss against Ebbsfleet United, which was the first game for Ebbsfleet under this name, having previously been known as Gravesend & Northfleet. In September 2007, Rusk was placed on the club's transfer list and joined Rushden & Diamonds on a one-month loan later that month.

York City
Manager Dino Maamria confirmed in January 2008 he was to move, with Weymouth believed to be his next destination. However, he signed a one-and-a-half-year contract with York City on a free transfer on 8 January. He made his debut in the team's 2–0 win against Aldershot Town in January and finished the season with 14 appearances for the club. He suffered a medial knee ligament injury during York's 1–1 draw with Torquay United on 28 August, which saw him substituted for Niall Henderson in the 73rd minute. He made his return on 20 September in a 1–1 with Salisbury City. He scored the winning penalty for York in a 4–2 penalty shoot-out victory against Mansfield Town in the Conference League Cup third round on 4 November, which finished 1–1 after extra time. He started in the FA Trophy Final at Wembley Stadium on 9 May 2009, which York lost 2–0 to Stevenage Borough. He was released by York following the end of the 2008–09 season, during which he made 47 appearances and scored one goal.

Crawley Town
Rusk joined Conference Premier team Crawley Town on 27 May 2009. He made his debut as a 22nd-minute substitute in a 4–0 defeat against Mansfield Town. Rusk went on to feature regularly during his first season for the club, making 42 appearances, many of which were at right-back. He was offered a new one-year contract in April 2010, which he signed in May. In February 2011, Rusk was an 81st minute substitute in Crawley Town's 1–0 FA Cup defeat to Manchester United at Old Trafford.

Due to a number of serious injuries, he retired following the end of the 2010–11 to take a role with Crawley's Centre of Excellence ahead of their first season in the Football League. He was appointed a youth team coach at Brighton & Hove Albion on 6 March 2012, a role involving overseeing the development of the club's scholars and managing the under-18 team.

Coaching career

Brighton & Hove Albion U23s
Rusk was appointed U23s Head coach in March 2015, stepping up from his role as U18s coach.

In February 2016, he was promoted to first-team coach by Chris Hughton until the end of the season, replacing the outgoing Nathan Jones. In the sixteen remaining games of the season, they lost just once as they sealed third-place in The Championship, missing out on automatic promotion by goal difference.

In the first year of Premier League 2's current format - he guided the Seagulls to an 8th-placed finish and reached the last sixteen of the EFL Trophy.

The following year, his side finished third in the league and won promotion to Premier League 2 Division 1 - the highest level for U23s football - for the first time ever, following a 2–0 victory over Aston Villa in the play-offs.

The 2018–2019 season saw a string of impressive results, including a 5–0 win over Manchester City
, as they went unbeaten in their first six games. Rusk's side finished the season in third-place, higher than a number of established academies, including Chelsea, Liverpool, Tottenham and West Ham.

Despite losing a number of key players to the senior squad in 2019–20, the side continued their good form and reached the knockout stages of the EFL Trophy for a second time under Rusk's management.

Stockport County
On 27 January 2021, Rusk became the manager of National League side Stockport County. On 27 October 2021, the club confirmed they had parted ways with Rusk.

Dundee 
On 17 February 2022, Rusk was announced as assistant manager of Scottish Premiership side Dundee under his assistant manager at Stockport, Mark McGhee until the end of the season. After the side was relegated with just one win in the duo's time there, it was confirmed in May 2022 that Rusk would take up a role with the English FA.

England
On 13 May 2022, Rusk was appointed a national coach with England men's teams. On 16 August 2022, it was confirmed that Rusk would take charge of the England U19s.

International career
Despite being born in England, Rusk was capped three times by the Scotland national under-18 team.

Career statistics

A.  The "League" column constitutes appearances and goals in the Football League and Football Conference.
B.  The "Other" column constitutes appearances and goals in the Conference League Cup, FA Trophy and Football League Trophy.

Managerial Statistics

Honours

Player
Boston United
Football Conference: 2001–02

Crawley Town
Conference Premier: 2010–11

Coach
Brighton & Hove Albion U23s
Premier League 2: Division 2 Play-Off Winner 2017–18

References

External links

1981 births
Living people
Sportspeople from Peterborough
English footballers
Scottish footballers
Scotland youth international footballers
Association football midfielders
Peterborough United F.C. players
Cambridge City F.C. players
Boston United F.C. players
Northwich Victoria F.C. players
Rushden & Diamonds F.C. players
York City F.C. players
Crawley Town F.C. players
National League (English football) players
English Football League players
Crawley Town F.C. non-playing staff
Brighton & Hove Albion F.C. non-playing staff
Stockport County F.C. managers
National League (English football) managers
Anglo-Scots
Dundee F.C. non-playing staff